Hazel is an album by the experimental rock band Red Krayola, released in 1996 by Drag City.

Critical reception
The Austin Chronicle wrote that "although a lot of Hazel is presented in a cut-and-paste carnival of strange narratives, short bursts of guitar/synthesizer, and bold U-turns galore, songs like 'I'm So Blasé' and 'Larking' capture the same infinite pop energy Chris Bell once reigned in." Magnet wrote that it possessed "a leaner, more subtle weirdness than previous records."

Track listing

Personnel 
Werner Büttner
Michael Baldwin
David Grubbs
George Hurley
Lynn Johnston
Hei Han Khiang
John McEntire
Albert Oehlen
Jim O'Rourke
Stephen Prina
Elisa Randazzo
Mary Lass Stewart
Mayo Thompson
Tom Watson
Christopher Williams

References

External links 
 

1996 albums
Drag City (record label) albums
Red Krayola albums